Miroir is a 1947 French drama film directed by Raymond Lamy. The film starred Jean Gabin.

Plot 
Miroir is about a businessman who moonlights as a gangster.

Cast

Production 
Miroir was produced by Alcina and Sud-Pacifique Films.

The assistant director for the film was Raymond Bailly, the dialogue writer was Carlo Rim, the screenwriters were Paul Ollivier and Carlo Rim, the director of photography was Roger Hubert, the sound engineers were Jean Putel and Jacques Carrère, the cinematographer was Marc Fossard, the production director was Marcel Bryau, the editor was Germaine Artus, the script supervisor was Jacqueline Loir, the production designers were Roland Berthon and Georges Wakhevitch, the composer was Maurice Yvain, the make-up artist was Boris de Fast, and the general manager was Claude Pinoteau.

The film is in black and white and was shot with 35 mm movie film. The aspect ratio of the film was 1.37:1, the Academy ratio. The audio of the film was monaural. The duration of the film is 90 minutes.

The film was the second French film that Jean Gabin acted in after spending World War II in the United States.

The film was the first film that Jacques Sernas acted in. He played a boxer.

Release 
The film was distributed internationally by Les Films du Jeudi.

The film was released in France on May 2, 1947.

Reception 
In France, Miroir had box office admissions of 1,776,310.

In the book Jean Gabin: The Actor Who Was France, Joseph Harriss described Miroir as a "mediocre gangster movie" and quoted Gabin as saying "I prefer to forget that one."

In the book Paris In The Dark: Going To The Movies In The City Of Light, 1930–1950, Eric Smoodin wrote that Miroir was "among the least favored" films to play at the Gaumont-Palace theater.

The film was favorably reviewed by Antoine Sire for Paris Fait Son Cinéma.

References

External links
Miroir at IMDb
Miroir at the Bibliothèque nationale de France

1947 films
Films scored by Maurice Yvain
French drama films
1947 drama films
French black-and-white films
1940s French films